Pang Ka Tsuen is a village in Pat Heung, Yuen Long District, Hong Kong.

History
The first legal case in Hong Kong, in which it was suggested that it might be possible for one leaseholder to prescribe for an easement against another was Pang Kwan Lung v Ma Choi Hop in the 1960s. The land of the applicant plaintiffs was at Pang Ka Tsuen.

References

Further reading

External links

 Delineation of area of existing village Pang Ka Tsuen (Pat Heung) for election of resident representative (2019 to 2022)

Villages in Yuen Long District, Hong Kong
Pat Heung